Beljanica is a mountain in the Homolje region in eastern Serbia, near the town of Žagubica. Its highest peak has an elevation of 1,339 meters above sea level.

References

Mountains of Serbia
Serbian Carpathians